Dillens is a surname. Notable people with the surname include:

Adolf Alexander Dillens (1821–1877), Belgian painter, brother of Hendrick
Hendrick Joseph Dillens (1812–1872), Belgian painter
Julien Dillens (1849–1904), Belgian sculptor

See also
Dillen